Playin' for Love is a 2013 comedy film starring Salli Richardson-Whitfield and Robert Townsend and directed by Townsend. The film, produced by Townsend Entertainment, premiered in 2013 at the American Black Film Festival and released theatrically in the United States on January 16, 2015.

Cast 
 Salli Richardson-Whitfield as Talisa McCoy
 Esai Morales as Principle Jose Marti
 Jenifer Lewis as Alize Gates
 Lawrence Hilton-Jacobs as Coach Preston Reid
 Robert Townsend as Coach Banks
 Bobby McGee as Milton Dudley
 Melyssa Ford as Bella
 Steve White as Reesie

References

External links 
 

American basketball films
American romantic comedy films
2013 films
2013 romantic comedy films
2010s English-language films
2010s American films